Jacob Frankel (July 5, 1808January 12, 1887) was a German-born rabbi who became the first official Jewish military chaplain of the United States, during the American Civil War.

Life and work 

Frankel came from a Jewish family with a long tradition of musicians based in Grünstadt in the Palatinate which was then part of the French Empire, and was the son of Joseph and Dorothe Fränkel.

With his two brothers he undertook concert tours, including to neighboring Alsace. Frankel, at the time of Rabbi Leopold Roos, became cantor at his Grünstadt home synagogue, and in 1844 he moved to Mainz. In 1848 he emigrated to the United States.

From 1848 to a year before his death, Frankel served as the cantor and leader of the Rodeph Shalom Congregation in Philadelphia, Pennsylvania. The congregation was a community of Ashkenazi Reform Judaism which had been founded in 1795. He was known as the "sweet singer of Israel."

Military career

Frankel was appointed the first official Jewish chaplain in the United States Armed Services on September 18, 1862, by President Abraham Lincoln. He was also the first non-Christian to be appointed as a chaplain. Until his appointment, the law required a chaplain to be ordained by a "Christian denomination." After Rabbi Arnold Fischel was elected to serve as chaplain-designate for the 5th Pennsylvania Cavalry Regiment, as a test case as opposed to their prior un-ordained minister, the Secretary of War Simon Cameron (for whom the regiment was named, "Cameron’s Dragoons") denied the request. This denial led to the Board of Delegates of American Israelites and Fischel to lobby to change the law. Fischel also met with President Lincoln who was in favor of changing the law. Once the law was changed, Lincoln appointed Frankel as the first Jewish chaplain. Frankel served in the military hospitals of Philadelphia which was a center of care for the war wounded. He held this post until mid-1865 and was discharged from the military at that time.

Death
Frankel died in Philadelphia in 1887 as a widower, leaving two sons and two daughters. Isaak Fränkel, one of his brothers, died on December 20, 1877, in Grünstadt at the age of 74 after serving as a cantor for the synagogue there for over 50 years.

Commemoration 
In commemoration of this, a medal was designed by the American sculptor Eugene Daub and issued by the Jewish-American Hall of Fame, the Four Chaplains' Medal. The obverse shows Jacob Frankel as the first Jewish chaplain of the United States Army, the reverse shows the fallen clergymen from 1943.

Literature 
 Henry S. Morais: The Jews of Philadelphia, Philadelphia, 1894, S. 73 u. 74; (Digitalscan)
 Jonathan D. Sarna, Adam Mendelsohn: Jews and the Civil War, NYU Press, 2011, S. 343–351, ; (Digitalscan)
 Lance J. Sussman: Isaac Leeser and the Making of American Judaism, Wayne State University Press, 1996, S. 224; (Digitalscan)
 Bernhard Kukatzki: Jacob Frankel (1808–1887), ein enger Freund Abraham Lincolns: ein Grünstadter war der erste jüdische Armeegeistliche der USA, in: Pfälzisch-rheinische Familienkunde, Band 16, 2009, S. 638–640; (Findhinweis)
 David B. Green: The U.S. Army gets its first Jewish chaplain, in: Haaretz vom 18. September 2013; (Digitalansicht)

References

External links 

 Obituary in the Philadelphia Times, 13 January 1887
 Biography of Jacob Fränkel, American Jewish Archives
 Jacob Frankel, military.com
 Jacob Frankel's Chaplaincy Certificate

Jewish American military personnel
Union Army chaplains
United States Army chaplains
Rabbis in the military
1808 births
1887 deaths
Rabbis from Philadelphia
People from Grünstadt
People of Pennsylvania in the American Civil War
German emigrants to the United States
19th-century American rabbis